The Ulster Transport Authority (UTA) ran rail and bus transport in Northern Ireland from 1948 until 1966.

Formation and consolidation

The UTA was formed by the Transport Act 1948, which merged the Northern Ireland Road Transport Board (NIRTB) and the Belfast and County Down Railway (BCDR). Added to this in 1949 was the Northern Counties Committee (NCC), owned by the British Transport Commission's Railway Executive since its previous owner, the London, Midland and Scottish Railway (LMS), had been nationalised in 1948.

Branch railway closures
In January 1950 the UTA closed almost the entire BCDR network except the Queen's Quay, Belfast – Bangor commuter line. In the same year it closed the Macfin – Kilrea section of the former NCC's Derry Central Railway and the freight-only former NCC line from Limavady to Dungiven. It also withdrew passenger services from the former NCC branch lines to Cookstown, Draperstown and Limavady and the Magherafelt – Kilrea section of the Derry Central. That summer it closed Northern Ireland's last  narrow gauge lines: the Ballycastle Railway and the Ballymena and Larne Railway.

In 1954 seven 6-coach diesel units were put on the Belfast-Bangor line, making it the first completely dieselised passenger service in Ireland.

In 1955 the UTA closed the (by then freight-only) branches to Cookstown and Limavady, and the line between Castlewellan and Newcastle, County Down (which was worked by the GNR).

In 1957 the Northern Ireland Government made the Great Northern Railway Board close much of its network in the province. This left no railways in many rural areas, including the whole of County Fermanagh. By 1958 the GNR main line was the only remaining railway across the border between the Republic of Ireland and Northern Ireland. In that year what was left of the GNRB was dissolved and split between Córas Iompair Éireann (the Republic of Ireland's nationalised transport company) and the UTA.

In 1959 the UTA closed the (by then freight only) remaining Magherafelt – Kilrea section of the Derry Central and the former GNR (by then freight only) branch from Dungannon to Cookstown. The UTA also took over the Londonderry Port and Harbour Commissioners' dual gauge railway that linked Derry's four railway termini, and in 1962 the UTA closed this railway as well.

The Benson Report
In 1962, on the recommendation of Dr Richard Beeching, the Government of Northern Ireland commissioned a senior Coopers & Lybrand accountant, Sir Henry Benson, to report on the future of the UTA's railways.

Benson recommended the only reason for retaining the main line between Portadown and Dundalk was not for transport or economics but solely political. The Republic of Ireland's government objected to Benson's proposal to single the track between Portadown and Dundalk so the Northern Ireland Government withdrew it.

Derry had two rail links with Belfast: the former NCC main line via Coleraine and the former GNR one via Portadown. Benson's recommendation to close both lines provoked strong protest from Northern Ireland's second city and towns along both routes.

In 1965 the Northern Ireland government implemented Benson's recommendation to close the former GNR route between Portadown and Derry, informally known as the "Derry Road", at the cost of 400 jobs. The government also closed the Belfast Central Railway, (that Benson had recommended retaining).

These closures left only the Belfast York Road – Londonderry Waterside,  –  and  –  lines in service.

Split into rail and road companies
Transport Acts in 1967 split the UTA into road and rail operations, the bus operations being taken over by a new company called Ulsterbus in the same year. The rail operations temporarily became Ulster Transport Railways (UTR) before being taken over by Northern Ireland Railways (NIR) in 1968.

Notes

Sources and further reading

External links
 Irish Railway Record Society: Ulster Transport Authority
 Irish Railwayana: UTA

Bus transport in Northern Ireland
Passenger rail transport in Northern Ireland
Former nationalised industries of the United Kingdom
1948 establishments in Northern Ireland
1966 disestablishments in Northern Ireland